Marcelino Paz is a paralympic athlete from Spain competing mainly in category B2 sprint events.

Marcelino competed at the 1988 Summer Paralympics winning a bronze medal in the 100m as well as finishing last in his semi final in the 400m.  At the 1992 games in his home country he really shone setting Paralympic records on the way to winning gold in the 100m and 200m and was part of the Spanish 4 × 100 m relay team that won gold in a new world record time.

References

Paralympic athletes of Spain
Athletes (track and field) at the 1988 Summer Paralympics
Athletes (track and field) at the 1992 Summer Paralympics
Paralympic gold medalists for Spain
Paralympic bronze medalists for Spain
Spanish male sprinters
Living people
Year of birth missing (living people)
Medalists at the 1988 Summer Paralympics
Medalists at the 1992 Summer Paralympics
Paralympic medalists in athletics (track and field)
Visually impaired sprinters
Paralympic sprinters